Sai Pin Wai, sometimes transliterated as Sai Bin Wai, is a walled village in the Yuen Long Kau Hui area of Yuen Long District, Hong Kong.

Administration
Sai Pin Wai is a recognized village under the New Territories Small House Policy. For electoral purposes, Sai Pin Wai is located in the Shap Pat Heung North constituency of the Yuen Long District Council. It is currently represented by Shum Ho-kit, who was elected in the 2019 elections.

History
The village was set up by the Tang Clan of Kam Tin probably in the 17th century. The Tang later considered that Sai Pin Wai and the nearby Nam Pin Wai, that they had also set up, were of bad feng shui and moved to nearby Ying Lung Wai.

Sai Pin Wai later became a multi-clan village inhabited by many Punti families surnamed Ng, Lau, Fan, Tang, Cheng, Leung, Wong and Lam. The Lams settled in the village in 1626 coming from Xixiang of Baoan, Guangdong Province.

Features
Sai Pin Wai consists mainly of five rows of houses facing west.

See also
 Walled villages of Hong Kong

References

External links

 Delineation of area of existing village Sai Bin Wai (Shap Pat Heung) for election of resident representative (2019 to 2022)
 Antiquities Advisory Board. Pictures of Nos. 92 & 93 Sai Pin Wai (demolished)

Walled villages of Hong Kong
Yuen Long
Shap Pat Heung
Villages in Yuen Long District, Hong Kong